Jolly Club was an Italian motor racing team, which competed in the World Rally Championship, the Sportscar World Championship, the European Touring Car Championship and briefly in the Formula One World Championship, along with several domestic championships, it was mainly connected to brands like Alfa Romeo, Lancia and Ferrari. It was created in 1957 in Milan by idea of Mario Angiolini,
the team won several championships. The team's main sponsor was Italian gaming totalizer Totip so the cars used orange and green colors on their livery until the World Rally Championship 1996. They also had a lengthy association with alcoholic beverage company Martini & Rossi.

Gianfranco Cunico won the Italian Rally Championship driving Escort Cosworths in 1994, 1995, 1996, the 1995 and 1996 cars were built by Malcolm Wilson Motorsport to be run by Jolly Club and sponsored by Martini, one of the most famous teams in the world with one of the most famous sponsors ensured victory

Drivers 
The team's most successful drivers were:

Alessandro Fiorio, 8 races and World Champion 4WD Group N with a Lancia Delta in 1987.
Dario Cerrato, 41 runs between the European Championships and Italian and European Champion in 1985 with a Lancia 037.
Miki Biasion, 32 races in World Championships and European Jolly Club and twice world rally champion with Martini Racing, also won the 1983 European Championship and the Italian Championship.

The team also competed in other drivers like: Roberto Businello, Arnaldo Cavallari, Sandro Munari, Lele Pinto, Amilcare Balestrieri, Tony Carello, Andrea Zanussi, Gianfranco Cunico, Tonino Tognana Italian Rally Champion 1982 with a Ferrari 308 GTB, Adartico Vudafieri, Italian Rally Champion in 1984 and Michele Rayneri, winner of Gr.B class in 1987 with the same car, the Lancia 037.
Many other drivers run with the Jolly Club Team. The Jolly Club Team had to be one of the most important rally teams from Italy, because it lets a lot of young drivers run.

After a bankruptcy in 1997 the Jolly Club closed.

In 2007, the Jolly Club was reborn in Florence, Italy with new ideas by an Italian gentleman and driver, Andrea Guidi.
The Mark is registered from 2007 in the European Economic Community and now the Jolly Club is an organization in TV, Media and Team for Motorsport passionates worldwide.

Cars 
Initially Jolly Club cars were mainly Alfa Romeos. Between 1957 and 1963 was used: Alfa Giulietta, TI Giulia Super, GTV 1.6, GTA 1.6.
From 1963 team collaborated with Autodelta development and career preparation GT Junior, AM GT, Alfa GTV 2.5 and 75 T.
That same year began partnership with Lancia and Fiat Fulvia 2C developing and the Lancia Stratos HF, the team continued his collaboration with Abarth to develop the Fiat 131 Abarth,

Lancia Rally, Ritmo, Fiat Uno Turbo, Delta S4 and Delta 4WD. Apart from the rally also developed Formula 1 cars, F2, F3 and Formula Junior, where the team won several times.

The team also collaborated with other brands like Ferrari and Porsche developing prototypes.
The Jolly Club team was active in other areas of the world of motor racing developed and planned and financed the young hopefuls, led to the sponsors on their investments, built race cars, engines, parts, etc.

Complete Formula One World Championship results
(key) (Results in bold indicate pole position; results in italics indicate fastest lap; † indicates shared drive.)

WRC results

WRC Results (Group B era)

 The results of the 1986 Rallye Sanremo were annulled by the FIA.

WRC Results (Group A era)

References

External links 
 jollyclub.eu
 jollyclub.it

World Rally Championship teams
Italian auto racing teams
Alfa Romeo in motorsport
Lancia
Formula One entrants
Italian Formula 3 teams
World Sportscar Championship teams
24 Hours of Le Mans teams